Cat flu is the common name for a feline upper respiratory tract disease. While feline upper respiratory disease can be caused by several different pathogens, there are a few symptoms that they have in common.

Avian flu can also infect cats, but "cat flu" is generally a misnomer, since it usually does not refer to an infection by an influenza virus. Instead, it is a syndrome, a term referring to patients displaying a number of symptoms that can be caused by one or more of these infectious agents (pathogens):

 Feline herpes virus causing feline viral rhinotracheitis (cat common cold). This is the disease most commonly associated with the "cat flu" misnomer. 
 Feline calicivirus—(cat respiratory disease)
 Bordetella bronchiseptica—(cat kennel cough)
 Chlamydia felis—(chlamydia)

In South Africa the term cat flu is also used to refer to canine parvovirus. This is misleading, as it does not refer to this feline upper respiratory disease but rather refers to the canine parvovirus which mainly infects dogs but can also infect other mammals such as cats, skunks and foxes 
.

In the 2013 psychological horror film Escape from Tomorrow, there is a fictional strain of cat flu surrounding the Disneyland parks, and according to the Disneyland nurse, "You could be a host and not even know it". The main protagonist Jim later experiences these symptoms in the end of the film, such as constipation, vomiting up massive hairballs and blood, and gradual weakening of his body. Later the next morning, his wife discovers his corpse with cat eyes and a grinning face.

References

Animal viral diseases
Cat diseases